The Institution of Structural Engineers is a professional body for structural engineering based in the United Kingdom.

The Institution has over 30,000 members operating in over 100 countries. The Institution provides professional accreditation for structural engineers and publishes a monthly magazine, The Structural Engineer.

The Institution also has a research journal titled Structures, published by Elsevier, Inc.

The Institution is an internationally recognised source of expertise and information concerning all issues that involve structural engineering and public safety within the built environment.

The Institution uphold standards, shares knowledge, promotes structural engineering and provides a voice for the structural engineering profession.

History

The Institution gained its Royal Charter in March 1934. It was established at the Ritz Hotel, London on 21 July 1908 as the Concrete Institute, as the result of a need to define standards and rules for the proper use of concrete in the construction industry.

H. Kempton Dyson was one of the founder members and the first permanent secretary.

On 22 February 1909, the Institution was incorporated under the Companies Acts 1862-1907 as a company limited by guarantee not having a capital divided into shares. It was renamed the Institution of Structural Engineers in 1922, when its areas of interest were extended to cover 'structures' of all kinds. By 1925 the Institution had 1,700 members and has continued to grow over the years. It has fifty groups worldwide.

The first woman member to be elected as an Associate member was Florence Mary Taylor in 1926. It took until 1947 for Mary Irvine to be the first women to be elected a Chartered Member, and until 1954 when Marjem Chatterton was the first woman elected as a Fellow.

Headquarters

The first Institution headquarters were established at No. 8, Waterloo Place, Pall Mall, London by the first President, the Right Honourable Robert Windsor-Clive, 1st Earl of Plymouth.

The Institution's current headquarters are at 47-58 Bastwick Street, London, EC1V 3PS, United Kingdom, after a move from Belgravia. The Duke of Gloucester officially opened the new International Headquarters on 14 May 2015.

Arms

See also
Construction Industry Council
Engineering Council UK (ECUK)
Institution of Civil Engineers
Gold Medal of the Institution of Structural Engineers
Structural Awards

References 

 
ECUK Licensed Members
1908 establishments in the United Kingdom
Organizations established in 1908